Zanthoxylum gilletii, the East African satinwood, is a tree species in the genus Zanthoxylum found in Africa. The fruits are used to produce the spice uzazi.

Chemistry
The alkaloid nitidine can be isolated from the plant.

The amide alkaloids N-(4-hydroxyphenethyl)octacosanamide, N-(4-hydroxyphenethyl)hexacosanamide, N-(4-hydroxyphenethyl)decanamide, N-vanilloyltyramine and N-[O-docosanoylvanilloyl]tyramine can be isolated from the stem bark. The lignan sesamin, the N-isobutylamide γ-sanshool, the acridone alkaloids 1-hydroxy-3-methoxy-N-methylacridone, arborinine, xanthoxoline and 1-hydroxy-3-methoxyacridone can also be extracted from the bark as well as the alkaloids oblongine, tembetarine and magnoflorine and the flavonoid hesperidin.

References

External links
 http://www.worldagroforestrycentre.org/sea/products/afdbases/af/asp/SpeciesInfo.asp?SpID=17988

gilletii
Flora of Africa
Plants described in 1975
Taxa named by Émile Auguste Joseph De Wildeman